KGVC may refer to:

 KGVC (FM), a defunct radio station (91.5 FM) formerly licensed to serve Glacier View, Alaska, United States
 KGVC-LP, a defunct low-power radio station (94.1 FM) formerly licensed to serve Des Moines, Iowa, United States